Broxburn is a hamlet consisting of a handful of scattered houses which serve the Broxmouth estate in East Lothian, Scotland. It is named after the stream upon which it stands, the Brox Burn. On the Brox Burn is Brand's Mill, dating from mediaeval times. The Battle of Dunbar, on 3 September 1650, took place on the foothills directly south, halfway between Brand's Mill and the hamlet of Little Pinkerton.

Not to be confused with the larger town of Broxburn, West Lothian.

See also
List of places in East Lothian

External links

 Broxburn

Villages in East Lothian
History of East Lothian